Nymphargus anomalus is a species of frog in the family Centrolenidae. It is endemic to Ecuador and occurs on the Amazonian slopes of the Ecuadorian Andes in the Napo Province. Common name Napo Cochran frog has been coined for it.

Description
Adult males measure  and adult females  in snoot–vent length. The snout is short and truncate. The tympanum is visible, with its upper edge barely covered by the weakly-developed supra-tympanic fold. The fingers are only slightly webbed and have broad discs. The toes are two-thirds webbed and have discs that are rounder and slightly smaller than those on the fingers. The coloration is tan, which is unusual among the related species—hence the specific name anomala, from Greek "unusual". There are small, black ocelli that enclose orange-tan spots.

Habitat and conservation
It is nocturnal. Males call from the vegetation. Females attach their eggs on mossy branches over the stream.

The habitat at the type locality has been subject to some habitat loss. For a long time, this was the only known locality. However, in 2009 one new population was found near the Llanganates National Park, and another from the Sumaco volcano (not specified whether the locality was within the Sumaco Napo-Galeras National Park).

References

anomalus
Amphibians of Ecuador
Endemic fauna of Ecuador
Taxa named by William Edward Duellman
Taxa named by John Douglas Lynch
Amphibians described in 1973
Taxonomy articles created by Polbot